Acarepipona is an Afrotropical genus of potter wasps.

References

Potter wasps